Allegra Spender (born 10 March 1978) is an Australian politician and businesswoman who is the member of parliament for Wentworth since 2022. She is the third generation of her family to sit in federal parliament, after her grandfather Percy and father John. One of a number of centrist "teal independents" opposing incumbent Liberal MPs, Spender ran on a platform of action on climate change, political integrity, and gender equality. She was a management consultant and corporate executive before entering politics, including as managing director of her mother Carla Zampatti's fashion label.

Early life 
Spender attended Ascham School where she was head girl, and achieved a UAI of 99.95. She then completed a MA in economics from the University of Cambridge, where she was at Trinity College.

Career 
Spender started her career as a management consultant at McKinsey & Company before working as a policy analyst in the UK Treasury. She later volunteered as a consultant in Kenya for Technoserve and at Change Leader at London's King's College Hospital. Spender has worked as Managing Director for her mother's fashion label Carla Zampatti. She was the Chair of the Sydney Renewable Power Company, and the CEO of the Australian Business & Community Network (ABCN), a social mobility charity that links students from low socio-economic schools and mentors from business.  

In November 2021, Spender declared that she would run as an independent candidate in the division of Wentworth at the 2022 Australian federal election. She cited government inaction on climate change as one of the key reasons for her candidature. She defeated Liberal incumbent Dave Sharma with 54 percent of the two-party vote, becoming one of several community independents to unseat Liberal incumbents. Though Sharma won a greater share of first preference votes, at 40% to Spender's 35%, Spender was elected on preferences. The seat had been in the hands of the Liberals or their predecessors for all but three years since Federation; Spender is only the second non-Liberal to win the seat at a general election.

Political views 
Spender supports strong action on climate change, with at least a 50% reduction in Australian emissions by 2030, and bringing in vehicle emission standards to reduce transport emissions. She supports increasing parental leave to 26 weeks with at least 6 weeks as a "use-it-or-lose-it" for 2nd parents, to increase the amount of leave taken by fathers and increase female economic empowerment. 

Spender has advocated reviewing the tax system, including considering raising the GST and changing stamp duty, and supports a temporary two-year increase of migration numbers to 220,000 to make up for the shortfall in workers from the COVID-19 pandemic.

In September 2022, it was reported that Allegra Spender is a corporate director of a private Australian company that did not pay tax on a $280m payment it received in 2019. The payment had already been taxed at the full corporate tax rate, before it was invested, and therefore did not need to be taxed further. The article was referred to Media Watch as misleading.

Personal life 
Spender comes from a high profile political family, with both her father and grandfather being MPs and both being posted as ambassadors. Spender is the daughter of former Liberal politician and diplomat John Spender and fashion designer Carla Zampatti. Her grandfather, Sir Percy Spender, was also an MP, diplomat and the president of the International Court of Justice. Her grandmother was  Jean, Lady Spender, who authored crime fiction as J. M. Spender.

She has a half-brother and a sister, Bianca Spender.

References

External links
 

Australian women in business
Australian people of Italian descent
Independent members of the Parliament of Australia
Members of the Australian House of Representatives
Members of the Australian House of Representatives for Wentworth
Women members of the Australian House of Representatives
Living people
Year of birth missing (living people)
Politicians from Sydney
Alumni of Trinity College, Cambridge
People educated at Ascham School